Kushtaka or Kooshdakhaa ( lit. "land otter man") are mythical shape-shifting creatures found in the folklore of the Tlingit peoples of the Pacific Northwest Coast of North America.

Description 
They are similar to the 'Watsa of the Ts'msyen people, Nat'ina of the Dena'ina Native Americans of South Central Alaska, and the Urayuli of the Yup'ik in Western Alaska.

Physically, Kushtaka are shape-shifters capable of assuming human form, the form of an otter and potentially other forms. In some accounts, a Kushtaka is able to assume the form of any species of otter; in others, only one. Accounts of their behaviour seem to conflict with one another. In some stories, Kushtaka are cruel creatures who take delight in tricking poor Tlingit sailors to their deaths. In others, they are friendly and helpful, frequently saving the lost from death by freezing. In many stories, the Kushtaka save the lost individual by distracting them with curiously otter-like illusions of their family and friends as they transform their subject into a fellow Kushtaka, thus allowing him to survive in the cold. Naturally, this is counted a mixed blessing. However, Kushtaka legends are not always pleasant. In some legends it is said the Kushtaka will imitate the cries of a baby or the screams of a woman to lure victims to the river. Once there, the Kushtaka either kills the person and tears them to shreds or will turn them into another Kushtaka. 

Legends have it Kushtaka can be warded off through copper, urine, dogs, and in some stories, fire.

Since the Kushtaka mainly preys on small children, it has been thought by some that it was used by Tlingit mothers to keep their children from wandering close to the ocean by themselves.

It is also said that the Kushtaka emit a high pitched, three part whistle in the pattern of low-high-low.

In modern literature 
Kusktaka appear in Pamela Rae Huteson's Legends in Wood: Stories of the Totems in the legend 'War with the Land Otter Men', as well as Pamela Rae Huteson's Transformation Masks with the 'Kooshdakhaa Den'; and Garth Stein's Raven Stole the Moon. Harry D. Colp describes a miner's encounter with the Kushktaka at Thomas Bay in the short story "The Strangest Story Ever Told."

It is also the subject of the Alaskan-set horror novel Kushtaka by David Pierdomenico. Kutshakas also appear in William Giraldi's novel Hold the Dark (2015). The second book of Ann McCaffrey's science-fiction The Twins of Petaybee series, Maelstrom, features a species of shape-changing deep-sea otter that refer to themselves as Kushtaka.

The Kushtaka is the main antagonist in the Bill Schweigert novel The Beast of Barcroft (2015).

They are also depicted in the book Shamans and Kushtakas: North Coast Tales of the Supernatural by Mary Giraudo Beck.

References

Alaska folklore
Tlingit mythology
Legendary creatures of the indigenous peoples of North America
Legendary mammals
Shapeshifting